is a 2012 Japanese horror film directed by Yōhei Fukuda.

Cast
Kazuki Shimizu as Masaya 
Sakiko Matsui as Mayumi

References

External links
Official website 

Japanese horror films
2010s Japanese-language films
2012 horror films
Films directed by Yōhei Fukuda
2012 films
2010s Japanese films